The Niagara 31 is a Canadian sailboat that was designed by Germán Frers as a racer-cruiser and first built in 1977.

Production
The design was built by Hinterhoeller Yachts in Canada, who completed 100 examples starting in 1977, but it is now out of production.

Design
The Niagara 31 is a recreational keelboat, built predominantly of fiberglass with balsa cores in the deck and hull. It has  teak wood trim. It has a masthead sloop rig, a raked stem, a raised transom, an internally mounted spade-type rudder controlled by a wheel and a fixed fin keel. It displaces  and carries  of ballast.

Later serial numbers were equipped with a Westerbeke  diesel with a "V"-drive.

The galley is located at the starboard side, at the bottom of the companionway stairs and includes a two-burner propane stove. The icebox is located on the port side, in the aft section of the navigation station. The navigation station seat and table both stow out of the way when not in use. The head is located forward, just aft of the bow "V"-berth and is separated from the main and forward cabins by folding doors. The head has a shower with a teak grating. Additional sleeping accommodation includes two main cabin settee berths, the port one a double berth. The interior is predominantly teak with varnished pine trim.

Ventilation is provided by two translucent hatches, one in the bow cabin and one in the main cabin. Of the six ports, four are fixed and two open.

The genoa has sheet tracks and two coaming-mounted winches. An additional coach house roof winch is provided for the halyards. The 4:1 mainsheet is mounted mid-cockpit. Additional winches are provided for reefing. There is a Cunningham, outhaul and boom vang

The design has a PHRF racing average handicap of 156 and a Portsmouth Yardstick handicap of 84.0.

Operational history
In a review Michael McGoldrick wrote, "despite its placid cruising exterior, the Niagara 31 offers some very good performance. This confirmed by its PHRF rating of 156, compared, for example, to the Aloha 32's rating of 171 (faster boats have lower PHRF numbers). The only drawback with the Niagara 31 is that it is a little more tender than most cruising boats in its size range."

Reviewer Richard Sherwood wrote of the design, "Beam is moderate and the hull is V-form. Design is modern, with a fin keel and semibalanced rudder. While this is a tall rig, the foretriangle is not excessively large, and handling of foresails is reduced."

A review in Practical Sailor noted, "when it comes to performance, the 31 excels. Thanks to its big sloop rig with 492 square feet of sail, it does nicely in light airs. This also means reefing is required earlier—most owners say at about 15 knots. And nearly all said so. Owners also report that the boat sails exceptionally well on all points; she's stable, well-balanced and quick. 'Will outpoint most racer-cruisers,' said the owner of a 1993 model. Another said, 'This is a technical cruiser/racer, not for the beginner.'"

See also
List of sailing boat types

Related development
Niagara 35

Similar sailboats
Allmand 31
Beneteau 31
Catalina 310
Corvette 31
Douglas 31
Herreshoff 31
Hunter 31
Hunter 31-2
Hunter 310
Hunter 320
Marlow-Hunter 31
Tanzer 31

References

Keelboats
1970s sailboat type designs
Sailing yachts
Sailboat type designs by Germán Frers
Sailboat types built by Hinterhoeller Yachts